Jón Arnar Magnússon (born 28 July 1969 in Selfoss) is a former decathlete from Iceland. He has won silver and bronze medals at world indoor championships, all in heptathlon, as decathlon is unsuitable for indoor contests. Jón is the Icelandic record holder at 110 m hurdles, long jump and decathlon and former record holder at 100 m and 200 m.

Achievements

Personal bests 

Outdoor
 100 metres - 10.56 (1997)
 200 metres - 21.17 (1996)
 400 metres - 46.49 (1998)
 1500 metres - 4:32.23 (1998)
 110 metres hurdles - 13.91 (1997)
 Long jump - 8.00 (1994)
 High jump - 2.07 (1998)
 Pole vault - 5.20 (1998)
 Shot put - 16.61 (1998)
 Discus throw - 51.30 (1996)
 Javelin throw - 64.16 (1998)
 Decathlon - 8573 (1998)
Indoor
 60 metres – 6.85 (1996)
 1000 metres – 2:39.55 (1999)
 60 metres hurdles – 7.98 (2000)
 High jump – 2.05 (2001)
 Pole vault – 5.10 (1998)
 Long jump – 7.82 (2000)
 Shot put – 16.34 (2001)
 Heptathlon – 6293 (1999)

External links 
 

1969 births
Living people
Icelandic decathletes
Jon Arnar Magnusson
Athletes (track and field) at the 1996 Summer Olympics
Athletes (track and field) at the 2004 Summer Olympics
People from Selfoss